Dionysius the Great was the 14th Pope and Patriarch of Alexandria from 28 December 248 until his death on 22 March 264. Most information known about him comes from his large surviving correspondence. Only one original letter survives to this day; the remaining letters are excerpted in the works of Eusebius.

Called "the Great" by Eusebius, Basil of Caesarea and others, he was characterized by the Catholic Encyclopedia as "undoubtedly, after St. Cyprian, the most eminent bishop of the third century... like St. Cyprian, less a great theologian than a great administrator."

Early life
Dionysius was born to a wealthy polytheistic family sometime in the late 2nd, or early 3rd century. He spent most of his life reading books and carefully studying the traditions of polytheists. He converted to Christianity at a mature age and discussed his conversion experience with Philemon, a presbyter of Pope Sixtus II. Dionysius converted to Christianity when he received a vision sent from God; in it he was commanded to vigorously study the heresies facing the Church so that he could refute them through doctrinal study. After his conversion, he joined the Catechetical School of Alexandria and was a student of Origen and Pope Heraclas. He eventually became leader of the school and presbyter of the church, succeeding Pope Heraclas in 231. Later he became Pope of the church of Alexandria & Patriarch of the See of St. Mark in 248 after the death of Pope Heraclas.

Work as Bishop of Alexandria
Dionysius was more an able administrator than a great theologian. Information on his work as Bishop of Alexandria is found in Dionysius' correspondence with other bishops and clergymen of the third century Catholic Church.  Dionysius’ correspondences included interpretations on the Gospel of Luke, the Gospel of John and the Book of Revelation.

During 249, a major persecution was carried out in Alexandria by a polytheist mob, and hundreds were assaulted, stoned, burned or cut down on account of their refusal to deny their faith. Dionysius managed to survive this persecution and the civil war that followed. In January 250 the new emperor Decius issued a decree of legal persecution. Out of fear many Christians denied their faith by offering a token polytheist sacrifice, while others attempted to obtain false documents affirming their sacrifice. Others who refused to sacrifice faced public ridicule and shame among their family and friends, and, if found by the authorities, brutal torture and execution. Many fled from the city into the desert, where most succumbed to exposure, hunger, thirst, or attacks by bandits or wild animals.

Dionysius himself was pursued by the prefect Aurelius Appius Sabinus, who had sent out an assassin to murder him on sight. Dionysius spent three days in hiding before departing on the fourth night of the Decian decree with his servants and other loyal brethren. After a brush with a group of soldiers, he managed to escape with two of his followers, and set up a residence in the Libyan desert until the end of the persecution the following year.

He supported Pope Cornelius in the controversy of 251, arising when Novatian, a learned presbyter of the Church at Rome, set up a schismatic church with a rigorist position on the readmittance of Christians who had apostasized during the persecution. In opposition to Novatian's teaching, Dionysius ordered that the Eucharist should be refused to no one who asked it at the hour of death, even those who had previously lapsed.

In 252 an outbreak of plague ravaged Alexandria, and Dionysius, along with other priests and deacons, took it upon themselves to assist the sick and dying.

The persecutions subsided somewhat under Trebonianus Gallus, but were renewed under Valerian who replaced Gallus. Dionysius was imprisoned and then exiled. When Gallienus, took over the empire he released all the believers who were in prison and brought back those in exile. Gallienus wrote to Dionysius and the bishops a letter to assure their safety in opening the churches.

During the debate with Pope Stephen and Cyprian, Dionysius supported the position of the Roman Bishop but he still supported the autonomy of the African churches.

Legacy
Basil of Caesarea writes to Pope Damasus I about aid sent by Dionysius, to the church at Caesarea. This correspondence is cited by Pope Pius IX in his encyclical Praedecessores Nostros (On Aid For Ireland) of 25 March 1847.

References

External links
 
 
The works of Gregory Thaumaturgus, Dionysius of Alexandria and Archelaus, trans. S. D. F. Salmond, Edinburgh, T. & T. Clark, 1871: Google Books, archive.org
F. C. Conybeare, "Dionysius of Alexandria, Newly discovered letters to the Popes Stephen and Xystus", English Historical Review 25 (1910) pp. 111-114 (tertullian.org copy)
Bishop of Alexandria, Saint Dionysius, "St. Dionysius of Alexandria Letters and Treatises", edited by Charles Lett Feltoe, The MacMillin Company, London, 1918
 

264 deaths
3rd-century Popes and Patriarchs of Alexandria
3rd-century Christian theologians
3rd-century Christian saints
Year of birth unknown